Lannan Neville Eacott (born 14 December 1994), better known as LazarBeam, is an Australian YouTuber, professional gamer and Internet personality, known primarily for his video game commentary videos, "comedic riffs" and memes.

Eacott began making slow motion demolition videos in 2014 while working in his family's construction business. After having his equipment stolen, he registered his current YouTube channel in 2015, Eacott primarily posted Let's Play and challenge videos of various video games. As his channel grew, his style of video content diversified to include more vlog and comedy style videos. His channel experienced substantial growth in popularity when he began posting videos of Fortnite Battle Royale in 2018 and of Minecraft in 2019. In December 2019, Eacott was acknowledged as YouTube's eighth-most-viewed content creator of the year, with 2 billion views in 2019.

, his three YouTube channels have collectively reached over 24 million subscribers and 8 billion video views, with his main channel ranking as the third-most-subscribed and third-most-viewed channel on the platform from Australia.

Career 
Eacott dropped out of high school at the age of 15 and started working in his family's construction business. He originally began posting videos of demolition in slow motion on YouTube, under the name "CrushSlash". After getting his recording equipment stolen, he registered the "LazarBeam" YouTube gaming channel on 4 January 2015; taking the name of one of his former RuneScape characters. Eacott focused on video game commentaries and challenge videos, primarily of the Madden NFL video game series. His channel experienced a substantial growth in popularity when he began playing Fortnite Battle Royale in 2018. On 18 September 2018, Eacott was announced as a member of the launch roster of the entertainment collective Click (also known as the Click Crew), alongside other Australian gaming personalities.

In April 2019, his channel reached 10 million subscribers, becoming the second Australian gaming content creator to hit that milestone. By July 2019, Eacott was the third-most-subscribed YouTube Fortnite streamer, with more than 10.8 million subscribers and over 7 billion video views. Eacott, along with some other streamers, was critical of the tenth season of Fortnite Battle Royale, which was released in August 2019 and introduced the "B.R.U.T.E"—a mechanical suit with missile launchers and a giant shotgun. The addition was described as "overpowered and unbalanced". Following this, Eacott's production of Minecraft-related videos began to increase, although he welcomed a Fortnite update that restricted the abilities of the mechanical suit. After the release of the game's second chapter in October 2019, the focus of Eacott's videos further shifted away from Fortnite; he stated that he was disappointed with the update's lack of content.

In October 2019, it was announced that Eacott would appear as himself in the 2021 film Free Guy, alongside streamers Ninja and Jacksepticeye. In December, Eacott was acknowledged in YouTube's 2019 end-of-year summary, YouTube Rewind 2019: For the Record, as the eighth-most-viewed content creator of the year, with 2 billion views in 2019. Reporting on this, Business Insider described him as being known for his "comedic riffs" and use of memes. They also noted Eacott's video-editing style, which "uses zoom in and spliced graphics to highlight his reactions, with a camera focused directly on his face as he sits in front of a computer screen."

On 13 January 2020, it was announced that Eacott, along with fellow Australian YouTuber Elliott "Muselk" Watkins, had signed a deal with YouTube to stream exclusively on that platform; he had previously streamed on Twitch. Eacott and Watkins celebrated the announcement by undertaking in a 12-hour live stream to raise money for the ongoing Australian bushfire relief effort, and raised . Eacott has partnered with Rooster Teeth, and is represented by Click Management and WME.

In June 2020, during Fortnites season-ending live event "The Device", Eacott's stream peaked at over 900,000 concurrent viewers. The following month, Click announced they would "stop filming [group] videos for the foreseeable future" with the members wanting to "spend time working on [their] own content". In December, Eacott was listed as the ninth top content creator of 2020 by YouTube, as well as the sixth-most-viewed gaming creator of the year and one of the top live streamers by views of 2020.

In March 2021, Eacott received his own Fortnite outfit in-game as part of the Fortnite Icon Series.

In 2022, Eacott and fellow YouTuber Fresh created World Boss, an arena shooter game, in collaboration with Australian developers PlaySide Studios. The game is currently available in Early Access on Steam.

Personal life 
Eacott has two brothers and a sister. His sister, Tannar, has a YouTube channel with over 1 million subscribers. In early 2019, Eacott had "code lazar", his unique identifier for Fortnite in-game purchases, tattooed on his forearm.

Filmography

Awards and nominations

References

External links 
 
 

1994 births
Australian YouTubers
Comedy YouTubers
Gaming YouTubers
Gaming-related YouTube channels
Internet memes
Let's Players
Living people
People from Tamworth, New South Wales
People from the Central Coast (New South Wales)
Twitch (service) streamers
Video bloggers
Australian video bloggers
Video game commentators
Vlogs-related YouTube channels
YouTube channels launched in 2015
YouTube vloggers
YouTube streamers
Minecraft YouTubers